The Sherbrooke Vert et Or football team represents the Université de Sherbrooke in Sherbrooke, Quebec in the sport of Canadian football in the RSEQ conference of U Sports. The Sherbrooke football team first began play in 1971 in the Quebec Universities Athletic Association, but only played for three seasons. The program was re-started in 2003 and has been in continuous operation since then. The Vert et Or football team is one of two U Sports football programs to have never won a conference championship, with the other being the York Lions.

History
The team began its second incarnation in 2003, thirty years after the first program was dropped in 1973. The Vert et Or first began to play in 1971 in the Quebec Universities Athletic Association as the Sherbrooke Estrien. The varsity team's name was changed to Sherbrooke Vert et Or in 1972. The program was dropped after the 1973 season due to a shift in philosophy as many francophone universities placed an emphasis on community involvement and intramural athletic activities as opposed to intercollegiate athletics. That philosophy shifted back to intercollegiate sports as Université Laval, Université de Montréal and Sherbrooke each began programs in 1996, 2002 and 2003, respectively.

The current football program has seen mixed success, with teams only qualifying for the postseason twice in its first seven years. However, the Vert et Or made progress after posting their first winning season in 2008 followed by their first appearance in the Dunsmore Cup championship in 2010, losing a close game to the Laval Rouge et Or. Then, in 2011, Sherbrooke finished in 2nd place in the Quebec conference and hosted their first playoff game. Consequently, then head coach André Bolduc was named the RSEQ coach of the year. The team finished in third place in 2012 and appeared in their second Dunsmore Cup, but once again lost to Laval. The teams remained competitive through to 2015, with back-to-back winning seasons and playoff appearances, but have since posted four consecutive losing seasons since 2016. The team's current head coach, Mathieu Lecompte, hired in advance of the 2017 season, is the first former Vert et Or football player to become the head of the program. In 2021, the Sherbrooke Vert et Or beat the Laval Rouge et Or for the first time in its history, at home, with a final score of 23-17.

Recent regular season results

Head coaches

National award winners
Russ Jackson Award: Clovis Langlois-Boucher (2007)

Sherbrooke Vert et Or in the CFL

As of the end of the 2022 CFL season, three former Vert et Or players are on CFL teams' rosters:
Alexandre Gagne, Montreal Alouettes
Anthony Gosselin, Ottawa Redblacks
William Langlais, Calgary Stampeders

References

External links
 

 
Vert
U Sports teams in Quebec
U Sports football teams